Alemitu Tariku (28 September 2000) is an Ethopian sprinter.

Career 
Alemitu Tariku gained her first international experience at the 2019 World Cross Country Championships in Aarhus , where she won the silver medal in the U20 classification in 20:50 minutes behind Kenyan Beatrice Chebet and won the gold medal with the Ethiopian team. She then won the 3000 meter dash at the Junior African Championships in Abidjan in 9:33.53 min. In August she won the bronze medal over 5000 meters in 15:37.15 min at the African Games in Rabat behind Kenyan Lilian Kasait Rengeruk and her compatriot Hawi Feysa.

Honor and Achievements

References

2000 births
Living people
Ethiopian female sprinters
Athletes (track and field) at the 2019 African Games
21st-century Ethiopian women